Sharpen Up (17 March 1969 – 2 March 1992) was British racehorse and sire. He was one of the leading European two-year-olds of his generation, winning all five of his races including the Seaton Delaval Stakes and the Middle Park Stakes. He failed to win in three starts in 1972 and was retired to stud. He became a highly successful breeding stallion in both Europe and North America. Sharpen Up died in 1992.

Background
Sharpen Up was a chestnut horse standing 16.1 hands high with a white blaze and white socks on his hind legs bred and owned by Mimi van Cutsem. He was sired by the American stallion Atan, who was retired from racing after winning his only race. His dam, Rocchetta, was a full sister to Outcrop, the winner of the Yorkshire Oaks. Sharpen Up was trained throughout his racing career by Bernard van Cutsem at the Stanley House tables in Newmarket.

Racing career

1971: two-year-old season
As a two-year-old in 1971, Sharpen Up was undefeated in five races. He won a maiden race at Leicester Racecourse in June by four lengths and the Cantley Plate at Doncaster before moving up in class to win the Hyperion Stakes at Ascot in July by three lengths and the Seaton Delaval Stakes at Newcastle in August. On his final appearance of the year he contested the Group One Middle Park Stakes over six furlongs at Newmarket Racecourse. Ridden by Willie Carson, he started the 5/6 favourite and won from the New Stakes winner Philip of Spain and the Prix Robert Papin winner Sun Prince.

Despite his successes, Sharpen Up was only the third highest rated colt of his generation in van Cutsem's stable, being ranked behind Crowned Prince and High Top in the Free Handicap.

1972: three-year-old season
On his three-year-old debut, Sharpen Up ran in the Greenham Stakes over seven furlongs at Newbury Racecourse and finished second to Martinmas. Sharpen Up missed the 2000 Guineas and did not appear again for three months. He was brought back to sprint distances for the July Cup over six furlongs at Newmarket. He sweated up before the race but ran well to finish second to the filly Parsimony. On his final appearance, he finished unplaced behind Deep Diver in the Nunthorpe Stakes.

Assessment
As a two-year-old, Sharpen Up was given a rating of 127 by the independent Timeform organisation, placing him seven pounds behind the top-rated Deep Diver.

Stud record
Sharpen Up was retired from racing to become a breeding stallion at the Side Hill Stud at Newmarket. In 1980 he was moved to stand at the Gainesway Farm in Kentucky. He was an exceptionally successful sire, whose progeny included:

Kris (1976) St James's Palace Stakes, Sussex Stakes, Queen Elizabeth II Stakes, Lockinge Stakes
Sharpo (1977) William Hill Sprint Championship x3, July Cup, Prix de l'Abbaye
Diesis (1980) Middle Park Stakes, Dewhurst Stakes
Keen (1981) 2nd St James's Palace Stakes, Heron Stakes
Pebbles (1981) 1000 Guineas, Eclipse Stakes, Champion Stakes, Breeders' Cup Turf
Trempolino (1984) Prix de l'Arc de Triomphe
Sanglamore (1987) Prix du Jockey Club, Prix d'Ispahan
Selkirk (1988) Queen Elizabeth II Stakes, Lockinge Stakes

Sharpen Up was also the broodmare sire of Mister Baileys, Cadeaux Genereux and Danehill Dancer.

Pedigree

References

1969 racehorse births
1992 racehorse deaths
Racehorses bred in the United Kingdom
Racehorses trained in the United Kingdom
Thoroughbred family 5-i
Chefs-de-Race